Miikka Ilo (born 9 May 1982) is a Finnish football player currently playing for KuPS.

References
Guardian Football
Veikkausliiga

Kuopion Palloseura players
FC Inter Turku players
Veikkausliiga players
1982 births
Living people
Finnish footballers
Finnish expatriate footballers
Expatriate footballers in the Netherlands
Salon Palloilijat players
SC Cambuur players
SC Telstar players
Eerste Divisie players
Association football forwards
Footballers from Turku